Abdus Sattar is a Awami League politician and the former Member of Parliament of Comilla-21.

Career
Sattar was elected to parliament from Comilla-21 as an Awami League candidate in 1973.

References

Awami League politicians
Living people
1st Jatiya Sangsad members
Year of birth missing (living people)